Not in Kansas Anymore is the second album by the group Basehead, released in 1993 via Imago.

Music and lyrics
The music style of Not in Kansas Anymore fuses elements of funk, hip hop, psychedelic, rock, rhythm and blues, and soul. The first half of the album is about racism; the second half deals with dating norms and rituals.

Reception
Rolling Stone reviewer Danyel Smith called the album "an alternative to the benign bullshit music that floods the chain stores and commercial radio waves." Stephen Thomas Erlewine wrote that "although it retains many of the same qualities of their critically acclaimed debut [...] there's nothing that has the same sense of discovery that made Play with Toys an interesting record."

Trouser Press called it "a shade less ambitious" than the debut but "nearly as good." Colson Whitehead, in The Village Voice, gave the album a mixed review, writing that it possessed even more of an indie rock sound than the debut.

Spin listed it as one of the 20 best albums of 1993.

The album didn't receive much airplay or sales.

Track listing

Personnel
 Michael Ivey – guitar, vocals and other stuff

References

1990 albums
Basehead albums